KSVE may refer to:

 KSVE (AM), a radio station (1650 AM) licensed to El Paso, Texas, United States
 KHRO, a radio station (1150 AM) licensed to El Paso, Texas, United States, which held the call sign KSVE from July 1992 to March 1994 and from June 1994 to September 2008
 the ICAO code for Susanville Municipal Airport